Childebrand I (678 – 743 or 751) was a Frankish duke (dux), illegitimate son of Pepin of Heristal and Alpaida, and brother of Charles Martel. He was born in Autun, where he later died. He married Emma of Austrasia and was given Burgundy by his father, becoming a duke. He distinguished himself in the expulsion of the Saracens from France alongside his brother when he captured Marseille, one of the largest cities still in Umayyad hands.

He was the patron of the continuator of the Chronicle of Fredegar, as was his son Nibelung I or Nivelon.

Some scholars believe that Childebrand was actually the half-brother of Charles Martel, related through his father. Childebran describes Charles Martel as 'germanus' meaning same mother, different father. Most accounts have Childebran's birth as 670 and the older half-brother of Charles Martel, with his father being named Fulcoald, who was the second son of Childebert, born in 602 to Theuderic II, King of Austrasia. Childebran's mother, Alpais, was the daughter of Childebert's first son, also named Childebran. Peppin and Alpais may have had another son, a younger brother of Charles Martel who was named Childebran as well. Childebran I acknowledged one son, Nivelon I, whose descendents bore the names of Fulcoald, Childebran, and Nivelon. William of Gellone and Raoul I(Robertian) are the only male descendents of Childebran I to become kings. His date of death is also contentious, as some sources place his death at 743 while others claim he lived until 751.

References

Notes 

678 births
751 deaths
8th-century Frankish nobility
Frankish warriors
Pippinids
People from Autun
7th-century Frankish nobility